Statistics of Emperor's Cup in the 1966 season. The cup was held between January 12 and January 15, 1967.

Overview
It was contested by 8 teams, and Waseda University won the championship.

Results

Quarterfinals
Toyo Industries 3–1 Kwansei Gakuin University
Furukawa Electric 2–0 Chuo University
Yawata Steel 2–0 Tokyo University of Education
Mitsubishi Motors 1–3 Waseda University

Semifinals
Toyo Industries 1–0 Furukawa Electric
Yawata Steel 1–2 Waseda University

Final
 
Toyo Industries 2–3 Waseda University
Waseda University won the championship.

References
 NHK

Emperor's Cup
Emperor's Cup